Austwell-Tivoli High School is a public secondary school located in unincorporated Tivoli, (USA) and classified as a 1A school by the UIL.  It is part of the Austwell-Tivoli Independent School District located in eastern Refugio County.  In 2015, the school was rated "Met Standard" by the Texas Education Agency.

Athletics
The Austwell-Tivoli Redfish compete in these sports - 

Volleyball, Cross Country, Basketball, Tennis & Track

State Finalist

Volleyball - 
1977(B)

References

External links
Austwell-Tivoli ISD

Public high schools in Texas
Public middle schools in Texas